William Hayes Fisher, 1st Baron Downham, PC, KStJ (1853 – 2 July 1920) was a British Conservative Party politician. He held office as President of the Local Government Board and Minister of Information in David Lloyd George's First World War coalition government.

Background and education
Born at Downham, (known now as 'Little Downham') in the Isle of Ely, Fisher was the son of Reverend Frederick Fisher, rector of that parish, and Mary, daughter of William Hayes. He was educated at Haileybury and University College, Oxford, and was called to the Bar, Inner Temple, in 1879.

Political career

Fisher was elected to the House of Commons for Fulham in 1885, a seat he held until 1906. He was private secretary Sir Michael Hicks Beach between 1886 and 1887 and to Arthur Balfour between 1887 and 1892 (who both served as Chief Secretary for Ireland at the time). In 1896 he was appointed a Junior Lord of the Treasury (government whip) in the Conservative administration of Lord Salisbury, a post he held until August 1902, and then served under Arthur Balfour as Financial Secretary to the Treasury from 11 August 1902 to April 1903, when he resigned as a result of his connection with a financial syndicate. He lost his Fulham seat at the 1906 general election but successfully reclaimed it at the January 1910 general election.  The following year he was sworn of the Privy Council.

Fisher returned to the government as Parliamentary Secretary to the Local Government Board in May 1915 in the newly formed coalition government led by H. H. Asquith. He retained this post also when David Lloyd George became Prime Minister in December 1916, but in June 1917 he was promoted to President of the Local Government Board with a seat in the cabinet. In November 1918 he was made Chancellor of the Duchy of Lancaster and Minister of Information, and a few days later he was raised to the peerage as Baron Downham, of Fulham in the County of London on 16 November. However, he stepped down from the government already in January 1919. Apart from his career in national politics, Fisher was an Alderman of the London County Council between 1907 and 1913 and its Chairman in 1919.

Family
Lord Downham married Florence, daughter of H. Fisher, in 1895. They had one daughter, the Hon. Rachel Fisher.

He died at Buckingham Palace Garden, London, in July 1920, when the barony became extinct. Lady Downham died in August 1923.

References

External links 
 

|-

1853 births
1920 deaths
Barons in the Peerage of the United Kingdom
Members of the Privy Council of the United Kingdom
Fisher, Hayes
Fisher, Hayes
Fisher, Hayes
Fisher, Hayes
Fisher, Hayes
Fisher, Hayes
Fisher, Hayes
UK MPs who were granted peerages
Fisher, Hayes
Chancellors of the Duchy of Lancaster
People from Downham Market
Barons created by George V